Scopelengys is a genus of blackchins.

Species
The recognized species in this genus are:
 Scopelengys clarkei J. L. Butler & Ahlstrom, 1976
 Scopelengys tristis Alcock, 1890 (Pacific blackchin)

References

Myctophiformes